Diána Szurominé Pulsfort (born 5 May 1983) is a Hungarian former racing cyclist. She competed in the 2013 UCI women's road race in Florence, and won the Hungarian National Road Race Championships three times, consecutively between 2013 and 2015.

References

External links

1983 births
Living people
Hungarian female cyclists
Place of birth missing (living people)